The 2019–20 Magyar Kupa, known as  for sponsorship reasons, was the 62nd edition of the tournament.

Schedule
The rounds of the 2019–20 competition are scheduled as follows:

Matches
A total of 38 matches were take place, starting with First round on 4 September 2019 and culminating with the Final on 17 May 2020.

First round
The first round ties was scheduled for 4–17 September 2019.

|-
!colspan="3" style="background:#ccccff;"| 4 September

|-
!colspan="3" style="background:#ccccff;"| 5 September

|-
!colspan="3" style="background:#ccccff;"| 7 September

|-
!colspan="3" style="background:#ccccff;"| 11 September

|-
!colspan="3" style="background:#ccccff;"| 17 September

|}

Second round
The second round ties was scheduled for 26 September – 9 October 2019.

|-
!colspan="3" style="background:#ccccff;"| 26 September

|-
!colspan="3" style="background:#ccccff;"| 8 October

|-
!colspan="3" style="background:#ccccff;"| 9 October

|}

Third round
The third round ties was scheduled for 16–30 October 2019.

|-
!colspan="3" style="background:#ccccff;"| 16 October

|-
!colspan="3" style="background:#ccccff;"| 22 October

|-
!colspan="3" style="background:#ccccff;"| 29 October

|-
!colspan="3" style="background:#ccccff;"| 30 October

|}

Fourth round
The fourth round ties was scheduled for 2–29 January 2020.

|-
!colspan="3" style="background:#ccccff;"| 2 January

|-
!colspan="3" style="background:#ccccff;"| 28 January

|-
!colspan="3" style="background:#ccccff;"| 29 January

|}

Fifth round
The fifth round ties was scheduled for 8 April 2020.

|-
!colspan="3" style="background:#ccccff;"| 7 April

|-
!colspan="3" style="background:#ccccff;"| 8 April

|-
!colspan="3" style="background:#ccccff;"| 15 April

|}

See also
 2019–20 Nemzeti Bajnokság I
 2019–20 Nemzeti Bajnokság I/B
 2019–20 Nemzeti Bajnokság II

References

External links
 Hungarian Handball Federaration 
 handball.hu

Magyar Kupa Women